Torwali is an Indo-Aryan language mainly spoken in the Bahrain and Chail areas of the Swat District in Pakistan. The language and other non-Pashtun communities are often referred to as "Kohistani" which is a name given by the Swat Pashtuns. Fredrik Barth says "The Pathans call them, and all other Muhammadans of Indian descent in the Hindu Kush valleys, Kohistanis". The Torwali language is said to have originated from the pre-Muslim communities of Swat. It is the closest modern Indo-Aryan language still spoken today to Niya, a dialect of Gāndhārī, a Middle Indo-Aryan language spoken in the ancient region of Gandhara.

Torwali is an endangered language: it is characterised as "definitely endangered" by UNESCO's Atlas of Endangered Languages, and as "vulnerable" by the Catalogue of Endangered Languages. There have been efforts to revitalize the language since 2004, and mother tongue community schools have been established by Idara Baraye Taleem-o-Taraqi (IBT).

Phonology

Although descriptions of Torwali phonology have appeared in the literature, some questions still remain unanswered.

Vowels

Lunsford had some difficulty determining vowel phonemes and suggested there may be retracted vowels with limited distribution:  (which may be ), . Retracted or retroflex vowels are also found in Kalash-mondr.

Consonants
The phonemic status of the breathy voiced series is debatable.

Sounds with particularly uncertain status are marked with a superscript question mark.

Alphabet 
The Torwali language does not have a fixed orthography.  There have been many proposals, which have seen limited use by the speakers, though there has been heavy work done for the language in recent years with the help of Zubair Torwali and Rehmat Aziz Chitrali.  Here is one of the proposals created by Zubair Torwali which is used in Swat:

Chitrali and Kohistani Alphabet 
The Torwali language in Chitral and Kohistan uses loanwords from Khowar and Indus Kohistani, the dominant languages in the region, which uses another letter, ݲ, which is used to represent .  They also use the Pashto letter ځ to represent .

References

Bibliography
Biddulph, John (1880). "Tribes of the Hindukush".
 
Ullah, Inam (2004). "Lexical database of the Torwali Dictionary", paper presented at the Asia Lexicography Conference, Chiangmai, Thailand, May 24–26.
Endangered Languages Project; http://www.endangeredlanguages.com/lang/3501/guide
SoundCloud https://soundcloud.com/zubairtorwali/sets/manjoora-torwali-melodies
Library of Congress https://books.google.com/books?id=JHLalS4Jp1oC&pg=PA7522&lpg=PA7522&dq=Torwali&source=bl&ots=NmYGuAzW7a&sig=ACfU3U1CDV7cwH6W1JF2R6GYYgQ_wkkUqw&hl=en&sa=X&ved=2ahUKEwjcq9qB-u3gAhWx_XMBHWngC244WhDoATABegQIAxAB#v=onepage&q=Torwali&f=false
Jalal Uddin https://paperswithcode.com/paper/a-step-towards-torwali-machine-translation-an
 
 Ahmad, Aftab (2015) Torvālī Urdū, angrezī lug̲h̲at = Torwali-Urdu-English dictionary https://trove.nla.gov.au/version/243822077

External links

 https://dsal.uchicago.edu/dictionaries/torwali/ A digital Torwali-English dictionary with audio
 https://182.180.102.251:8081/otd/HomePage.aspx/ Online Torwali-Urdu Dictionary (Center for Language Engineering at UET, Lahore Pakistan)
 https://www.unesco.org/culture/ich/doc/src/00851-EN.doc (UNESCO Register of Good Practices in Language Preservation)
 Jalal Uddin https://www.aclweb.org/anthology/W19-6802
 http://torwaliresearchforums.org/ A website providing information about Torwali language and computational developments made in Torwali language. Jalaluddin
 https://web.archive.org/web/20151208134056/http://torwali.base.pk/ A website providing information about the Torwali language and the history of the Torwali people. Includes photos, classification, etc.
 https://www.torwali.org a website managed by the Swat based organization Idara Baraye Taleem-o-Taraqi (IBT) i.e institute for education and development, that works for the integrated development of the ethno-linguistic communities of Pakistan including the Torwalis. 
 https://torwali.omeka.net/ An Endangered Language Project created by Amber Khan for English 318 at Southern Illinois University Edwardsville 
Ahmad, Aftab (2016) Reversing language loss through identity based educational planning—the case of the Torwali language . http://www.lc.mahidol.ac.th/mleconf/2016/Documents/PresentedFiles/Parallel%20VI/T3-9/5C-Aftab%20Ahmad.pdf 

Dardic languages
Languages of Khyber Pakhtunkhwa
Tonal languages in non-tonal families